France.tv Slash is a French public service television channel that is part of the France Télévisions network.

It is dedicated to youth with programs for young adults. France.tv Slash is the first French public service channel to be fully digital and available on platforms, and since November 2018 on Snapchat.

The new channel is aimed at an audience between high school and working life and deals with themes such as sexuality, discrimination, body, identity, commitment, consumption and connected life through true life stories and testimonials.

History 
On February 5, 2018, France Televisions announced the creation of a channel that would be fully digital and dedicated to young adults with the launch of the Skam France television series on the platform; it is a series that follows the daily lives of several teenagers. Each season of Skam France is focused on a specific character and a particular theme.

Throughout the week, sequences are published on the platform france.tv to form a complete Skam France episode for each weekend of an average of twenty minutes. Viewers can also follow the characters through their accounts on Instagram. The cumulative audience of Season 3 is known to amount up to 28 million views on the platforms where the show is broadcast.

In November 2018, France.tv Slash arrived on the platform's Discover service with the show Sexy Soucis presented by Diane Saint-Réquier, in which she answers questions about sexuality.

Programming 

 La Petite Mort (2017–2019, 10 episodes)
  (known as Woke internationally) (2017–2018, 2 seasons, 20 episodes, ongoing)
 Monsieur Flap (2017–2019, 11 episodes)
 Rap Fighter Cup (2018–2019, ongoing)
 Preview (2018–2019, 8 episodes)
 Croc Love (2018–2019, 10 episodes)
  (2018–2019)
  (2017–2022, 10 seasons, 102 episodes)
 Stalk (2020, 10 episodes)
 Amours solitaires (2020)
 Le Syndrome de l'Iceberg (2020)
 Drag Race France (2022)

France.tv Slash is available on the streaming platform France.tv.

See also 

 France Télévisions
 List of television stations in France

References

Bibliography

External links 
 

Television channels and stations established in 2018
France Télévisions
Television stations in France